Paris–Roubaix Femmes is a one day women's bicycle race on cobbled roads (or pavé) in northern France, held annually in early April. It is part of the UCI Women's World Tour. The equivalent men's race is a cycling monument, and after the Tour of Flanders and Liège–Bastogne–Liège, is the third to stage a women's edition.

History
Paris–Roubaix is one of cycling's oldest races, and was first held in 1896. The announcement of the inaugural women's edition of Paris–Roubaix came as a surprise addition to the revised 2020 UCI Women's World Tour calendar. The race was scheduled for 25 October 2020, but was cancelled due to the COVID-19 pandemic. 

The first edition of Paris–Roubaix Femmes took place in 2021, with Lizzie Deignan winning following a 80km solo attack described by commentators as one of the greatest Roubaix rides of all time.

Course 
The race is famous for its rough terrain, mud and cobblestones (pavé) - and has been nicknamed l'enfer du Nord, or Hell of the North. The Paris–Roubaix Femmes course uses the same roads and cobbled sectors as the men's race - albeit over a shorter distance (around 115 to 125km) - before finishing in the Roubaix Velodrome. Both editions of the race have so far started in Denain, with 17 sectors of pavé including the famed Carrefour de l'Arbre and the Mons-en-Pévèle - both ranked at "five stars" in difficulty.

Winners & Records

References

External links
 

Paris–Roubaix
UCI Women's World Tour
UCI Women's World Tour races
Recurring sporting events established in 2021